Vladimir Cheburin (Russian: Владимир Чебурин; born 7 July 1965) is a Kazakh football manager who is the head coach of FK Žalgiris in Lithuania.

Career

Cheburin started his managerial career with Shakhter Karagandy. In 2011, he was appointed head coach of Okzhetpes in the Kazakhstan Premier League, a position he held until 2013. After that, he coached Lithuanian clubs FK Kruoja Pakruojis and FK Sūduva.

References

External links 
 Vladimir Cheburin: “There were no offers to work from me from Kazakhstan”
 Vladimir Cheburin: “Leading Lithuanian clubs would not be lost in the championship of Kazakhstan”
 Cheburin, a step away from his dream: "If I'm honest, this year is more damaging"
 Vladimir Cheburin: “I am only 46”

1965 births
Living people
Kazakhstani football managers
Soviet footballers
Association football defenders
FC Shakhter Karagandy players
FC Kaisar players
Kazakhstani expatriate football managers
Expatriate football managers in Lithuania
FC Shakhter Karagandy managers
FC Okzhetpes managers
FK Sūduva Marijampolė managers
FK Žalgiris managers